"Uncle Albert/Admiral Halsey" is a song by Paul and Linda McCartney from the album Ram. Released in the United States as a single on 2 August 1971, it reached number one on the Billboard Hot 100 on 4 September 1971, making it the first of a string of post-Beatles, Paul McCartney-penned singles to top the US pop chart during the 1970s and 1980s. Billboard ranked the song as number 22 on its Top Pop Singles of 1971 year-end chart. It became McCartney's first gold record after the breakup of the Beatles.

Elements and interpretation
"Uncle Albert/Admiral Halsey" is composed of several unfinished song fragments that Norwegian engineer Eirik Wangberg stitched together in a similar manner to the medleys from the Beatles' 1969 album Abbey Road. The orchestral arrangements by George Martin were recorded in New York at A & R Recording, along with other instruments by McCartney and his new band. The project was moved to Los Angeles where vocals were added by Paul and Linda McCartney—her first experience of recording in a professional studio. The song is notable for its thunderstorm and environmental sound effects added by Wangberg in Los Angeles; he had been invited by McCartney to mix and sequence the Ram album in any way he saw fit, and he copied the thunder from a monaural film soundtrack, then fashioned an artificial stereo version of it for the song.

McCartney stated that "Uncle Albert" was based on his uncle: "He's someone I recall fondly, and when the song was coming it was like a nostalgia thing." He also stated that "I had an uncle – Albert Kendall – who was a lot of fun, and when I came to write 'Uncle Albert'/'Admiral Halsey' it was loosely about addressing that older generation, half thinking, What would they think of the way my generation does things? That's why I wrote the line 'We're so sorry, Uncle Albert.'" McCartney also told an American journalist, "As for Admiral Halsey, he's one of yours, an American admiral", referring to Fleet Admiral William "Bull" Halsey (1882–1959). McCartney has described the "Uncle Albert" section of the song as an apology from his generation to the older generation, and Admiral Halsey as an authoritarian figure who ought to be ignored.

Reception
Paul McCartney won the Grammy Award for Best Arrangement Accompanying Vocalists in 1971 for the song. The single was certified Gold by the Recording Industry Association of America for sales of over one million copies.

According to Allmusic critic Stewart Mason, fans of Paul McCartney's music are divided in their opinions of this song. Although some fans praise it as "one of his most playful and inventive songs" others criticize it for being "exactly the kind of cute self-indulgence that they find so annoying about his post-Beatles career." Mason himself considers it "churlish" to be annoyed by the song, given that the song isn't intended to be completely serious, and praises the "Hands across the water" section as being "lovably giddy."  Ultimate Classic Rock critic Nick DeRiso states that the song feels "more calculatedly twee than truly inspired, despite its episodic construction" and that its main weakness is that it exposes McCartney's awareness of his own charm.

In a contemporary review of RAM, Jon Landau of Rolling Stone gave "Uncle Albert/Admiral Halsey" a negative review, saying the song is "a piece with so many changes it never seems to come down anywhere, and in the places that it does, sounds like the worst piece of light music Paul has ever done."  Cash Box said that the song "is bursting with fine melodies and interesting musical changes certain to please both AM and underground programmers."

A retrospective 2012 Pitchfork review by Jayson Greene states "Uncle Albert/Admiral Halsey is not only Ram centerpiece, it is clearly one of McCartney’s five greatest solo songs. As the slash in the title hints, it's a multi-part song, starring two characters. To put its accomplishments in an egg-headed way: It fuses the conversational joy listeners associated with McCartney's melodic gift to the compositional ambition everyone assumed was Lennon's. To put it a simpler way: Every single second of this song is joyously, deliriously catchy, and no two seconds are the same."

On the US charts, the song set a milestone as the all-time songwriting record (at the time) for Paul McCartney for the most consecutive calendar years to write a #1 song. This gave him eight consecutive years (starting with "I Want to Hold Your Hand"), leaving Lennon behind with only seven years.

Later release
"Uncle Albert/Admiral Halsey" appears on the Wings Greatest compilation album released in 1978, even though Ram was not a Wings album.

The song appears on several solo Paul McCartney compilations: the US version of All the Best! (1987), as well as Wingspan: Hits and History (2001), and on both the standard and deluxe versions of Pure McCartney (2016). It was also included on The 7" Singles Box in 2022.

Personnel
Paul McCartney – vocals, electric guitar, acoustic guitar, piano, bass and xylophone
Linda McCartney – backing vocals
Hugh McCracken – acoustic and electric guitar
Denny Seiwell – drums
Paul Beaver – synthesizer
David Nadien, Aaron Rosand – violin
Marvin Stamm, Mel Davis, Ray Crisara, Snooky Young – brass
New York Philharmonic Orchestra – orchestral backing
George Martin – orchestral arrangement

Chart performance

Weekly charts

Year-end charts

Certifications

Notes

References

External links
 

1970 songs
1971 singles
Paul McCartney songs
Apple Records singles
Billboard Hot 100 number-one singles
Cashbox number-one singles
Songs written by Paul McCartney
Songs written by Linda McCartney
Song recordings produced by Paul McCartney
Music published by MPL Music Publishing
RPM Top Singles number-one singles
Number-one singles in New Zealand
Music medleys
Grammy Award for Best Instrumental Arrangement Accompanying Vocalist(s)